Francisco Gabriel Escudero Martínez (born 24 March 1966), commonly known as Paquito, is a Spanish retired football midfielder and manager.

The vast majority of his professional career was associated with Hércules, as he served the club as a player, coach and director of football.

Playing career
Born in Rafal, Alicante, Valencian Community, Paquito started playing football in the neighborhood of La Florida. He made his senior debut with Alicante CF in Tercera División, going on to play two seasons with Benidorm CF and helping the team promote (also finishing the regular season as champions) to Segunda División B for the second time in their history.

In 1990, Paquito remained in his native region and signed with Hércules CF, helping to promotion to Segunda División in his third year. In his 11-year spell he appeared in 342 official games, contributing with 34 matches (one goal) as the club returned to La Liga after a ten-year absence and being again an undisputed starter the following campaign, which ended in immediate relegation; his top-flight debut occurred on 1 September 1996, in a 2–1 home win against CF Extremadura.

Coaching career
Paquito suffered a serious injury during 1999–00, with Hércules in the third division, officially retiring from football in May 2001 at age 35. He remained with the club working in directorial capacities and, in 2003, began working as an assistant coach, a position he held under managers José Carlos Granero, Juan Carlos Mandiá, José Bordalás and Josu Uribe.

On 15 May 2007, following Uribe's dismissal, Paquito was named head coach until the end of the second division season, eventually avoiding relegation with two wins, one draw and two losses in his five games in charge. He was named director of football in the following campaign, remaining in charge for several years.

Honours

Player
Hércules
Segunda División: 1995–96

Benidorm
Tercera División: 1988–89

References

External links

1966 births
Living people
People from Vega Baja del Segura
Sportspeople from the Province of Alicante
Spanish footballers
Footballers from the Valencian Community
Association football midfielders
La Liga players
Segunda División players
Segunda División B players
Tercera División players
Alicante CF footballers
Benidorm CF footballers
Hércules CF players
Spanish football managers
Segunda División managers
Hércules CF managers